Ignatov,  Ignatow, or Ignatova (feminine; Игнатова), is a popular Russian and Bulgarian surname which may refer to:

Amy Ignatow, (born 1977), American cartoonist
Andrey Ignatov (born 1968), Russian long jumper
David Ignatow (1914–1997), American poet
Evgeni Ignatov (runner) (born 1959), Bulgarian long-distance runner 
Evgeni Ignatov (footballer) (born 1988), Bulgarian football player
Hasan & Ibrahim Ignatov (born 2003), Bulgarian twin child pianists
Lilia Ignatova (born 1965), Bulgarian gymnast
Mihaela Ignatova, Bulgarian mathematician
Mikhail Ignatov (born 2000), Russian football player
Mel Ignatow, American murderer
Natalya Ignatova (born 1973), Russian sprinter
Nikolay Ignatov (1901–1966), Soviet politician
Roman Ignatov (born 1973), Russian football player
Ruja Ignatova (born 1980), Bulgarian financial criminal
Sergei Ignatov (born 1960), Bulgarian politician and Egyptologist
Sergej Ignatov (born 1950), Russian juggler
Stojan Ignatov (born 1979), Bulgarian football player
Valentin Ignatov (surgeon)
Valentin Ignatov (footballer) (born 1966), Bulgarian football player
Viktor Ignatov (born 1968), Russian politician
Yevgeny Ignatov (canoeist) (born 1979), Russian sprint canoer

See also
Ignatyev
Ignatów (disambiguation) (for Polish place names)

Bulgarian-language surnames
Russian-language surnames